The following lists events that happened during 1930 in the Union of Soviet Socialist Republics.

Incumbents
 General Secretary of the Communist Party of the Soviet Union – Joseph Stalin
 Chairman of the Central Executive Committee of the Congress of Soviets – Mikhail Kalinin
 Chairman of the Council of People's Commissars of the Soviet Union – Alexei Rykov (until 19 December), Vyacheslav Molotov (starting 19 December)

Events

June
26 June – 13 July – 16th Congress of the All-Union Communist Party (Bolsheviks).

November
25 November – 7 December – The Industrial Party Trial is held.

Births
9 January – Igor Netto, footballer
26 February – Vladimir Kesarev, footballer
15 March – Mariya Orlyk, teacher and politician
10 April – Vladimir Yerokhin, footballer (d. 1996)
16 April – Fyodor Bogdanovsky, Olympic weightlifter
19 May – Leonid Kharitonov, actor
29 June – Anatoli Maslyonkin, footballer
10 July – Dmitry Oboznenko, painter
21 September – Sergei Popov, Olympic athlete
7 October – Yuri Dubinin, diplomat (d. 2013)
21 October – Ivan Silayev, politician (d. 2023)
29 December – Vladimir Ryzhkin, footballer
31 December – Anatoly Borisovich Kuznetsov, actor

Deaths 
14 April – Vladimir Mayakovsky, poet (born 1893)

See also
1930 in fine arts of the Soviet Union
List of Soviet films of 1930

References

 
1930s in the Soviet Union
Years in the Soviet Union
Soviet Union
Soviet Union
Soviet Union